San Francisco Ballet dances each year at the  War Memorial Opera House, San Francisco, and tours; this is the list of ballets with casts for the 2010 season beginning with the gala, Wednesday, January 20, 2010. The Nutcracker is danced the year before.

Gala

Wednesday, January 20

notes for gala 

The Gala's theme was "Silver Celebration" commemorating Artistic Director Helgi Tomasson's 25th anniversary with the company.

Program one, January 23–31, Full-length
 Swan Lake

Program two, February 9–20, Mixed bill
 Opus 19/The Dreamer
 Ghosts
 Company B

Program three, February 11–21,Mixed bill -- Balanchine Masterworks
 Serenade
 Stravinsky Violin Concerto
 Theme and Variations

Program four, March 2–7, Mixed bill
 Diving into the Lilacs
 in the middle, somewhat elevated
 Petrouchka

Program five, March 20–28, Full-length
 The Little Mermaid

Program six, April 8–21, Mixed program
 “Haffner” Symphony
 Underskin
 Russian Seasons

Program seven, April 9–20, Mixed program
 Rush
 Classical Symphony
 The Concert (Or, The Perils of Everybody)

Program eight, May 1–9, Full-length
 Romeo & Juliet

External links

References

San Francisco Ballet
Lists of ballets by company
Ballet
2010 in San Francisco